Wellington North was, from 1905 to 1946, a parliamentary electorate within the area encompassing New Zealand's capital, Wellington. The electorate was represented by four Members of Parliament.

Population centres
The electorate covered areas north of the central city. For the purpose of the country quota, the electorate has always been regarded as fully urban.

History
Herdman had previously represented the  electorate. He joined the Reform Party but resigned from Parliament in February 1918.

Herdman was succeeded by John Luke of the Reform Party in the resulting . Chapman represented the electorate from 1928 to 1946, and moved to the  electorate when Wellington North was abolished.

Members of Parliament
The electorate was represented by four Members of Parliament:

Key

Election results

1943 election

1938 election

1935 election

1931 election

1928 election

1925 election

1922 election

1919 election

1918 by-election

1914 election

1911 election

1908 election

 
 
 
 
 
 
|-
|style="background-color:#E9E9E9" ! colspan="6" style="text-align:left;" |'''Second ballot result
|-

1905 election

Notes

References

Historical electorates of New Zealand
Politics of the Wellington Region
1905 establishments in New Zealand
1946 disestablishments in New Zealand